The Laboulbeniaceae are a large family of fungi in the Laboulbeniales order in the Ascomycota. This is a widely distributed family that are parasitic to various orders of insects. This is a list of the genera within the family, based on the 2007 Outline of Ascomycota.

Acallomyces Thaxt.
Acompsomyces  Thaxt.
Acrogynomyces  Thaxt.
Amorphomyces  Thaxt.
Amphimyces  Thaxt.
Apatelomyces Thaxt.
Apatomyces  Thaxt.
Aphanandromyces  W.Rossi
Aporomyces  Thaxt.
Arthrorhynchus  Kolen.
Asaphomyces  Thaxt.
Autophagomyces  Thaxt.
Balazusia  R.K. Benj.
Benjaminiomyces  I.I.Tav.
Blasticomyces  I.I.Tav.
Botryandromyces  I.I.Tav. & T. Majewski
Camptomyces  Thaxt.
Cantharomyces  Thaxt.
Capillistichus  Santam.
Carpophoromyces  Thaxt.
Chaetarthriomyces  Thaxt.
Chaetomyces  Thaxt.
Chitonomyces  Peyronel
Clematomyces  Thaxt.
Clonophoromyces  Thaxt.
Columnomyces  R.K.Benj.
Compsomyces  Thaxt.
Coreomyces  Thaxt.
Corethromyces  Thaxt.
Corylophomyces  R.K.Benj.
Cryptandromyces  Thaxt.
Cucujomyces  Speg.
Cupulomyces  R.K.Benj.
Dermapteromyces  Thaxt.
Diandromyces  Thaxt.
Diaphoromyces  Thaxt.
Diclonomyces  Thaxt.
Dimeromyces  Thaxt.
Dimorphomyces  Thaxt.
Dioicomyces  Thaxt.
Diphymyces  I.I.Tav.
Diplomyces  Thaxt. (position uncertain)
Diplopodomyces  W.Rossi & Balazuc
Dipodomyces  Thaxt.
Distolomyces  Thaxt.
Dixomyces  I.I.Tav.
Ecteinomyces  Thaxt.
Enarthromyces  Thaxt.
Eucantharomyces  Thaxt.
Euhaplomyces  Thaxt.
Eumisgomyces  Speg.
Eumonoicomyces  Thaxt.
Euphoriomyces  Thaxt.
Fanniomyces  Maj.
Filariomyces  Shanor
Gloeandromyces  Thaxt.
Haplomyces Thaxt.
Hesperomyces  Thaxt.
Histeridomyces  Thaxt.
Homaromyces  R.K.Benj.
Hydraeomyces  Thaxt.
Hydrophilomyces  Thaxt.
Idiomyces  Thaxt.
Ilyomyces  F.Picard
Ilytheomyces  Thaxt.
Kainomyces  Thaxt.
Kleidiomyces  Thaxt.
Kruphaiomyces  Thaxt.
Kyphomyces  I.I.Tav.
Laboulbenia  Mont. & C.P.Robin
Limnaiomyces  Thaxt.
Majewskia  Y.-B.Lee & Sugiyama
Meionomyces  Thaxt.
Microsomyces  Thaxt.
Mimeomyces  Thaxt.
Misgomyces  Thaxt.
Monandromyces  R.K.Benj.
Monoicomyces  Thaxt.
Nanomyces  Thaxt.
Neohaplomyces  R.K.Benj.
Nycteromyces  Thaxt.
Ormomyces  I.I.Tav.
Osoriomyces  Terada
Parvomyces  Santam.
Peyerimhoffiella  Maire
Peyritschiella  Thaxt.
Phalacrichomyces  R.K.Benjamin
Phaulomyces  Thaxt.
Picardella  I.I.Tav.
Polyandromyces  Thaxt.
Polyascomyces  Thaxt.
Porophoromyces  Thaxt.
Prolixandromyces  R.K.Benj.
Pselaphidomyces  Speg.
Rhachomyces  Thaxt.
Rhipidiomyces  Thaxt.
Rhizomyces  Thaxt.
Rhizopodomyces  Thaxt.
Rickia  Cavara
Rossiomyces  R.K.Benj.
Sandersoniomyces  R.K.Benj.
Scalenomyces  I.I.Tav.
Scaphidiomyces  Thaxt.
Scelophoromyces  Thaxt.
Scepastocarpus  Santam.
Siemaszkoa  I.I.Tav. & Maj.
Smeringomyces  Thaxt.
Sphaleromyces  Thaxt.
Stemmatomyces  Thaxt.
Stichomyces  Thaxt.
Stigmatomyces  H.Karst.
Sugiyamaemyces  I.Tavares & Balazuc
Symplectromyces  Thaxt.
Sympodomyces  R.K.Benj.
Synandromyces  Thaxt.
Tavaresiella  T.Majewski
Teratomyces  Thaxt.
Tetrandromyces  Thaxt.
Trenomyces  Chatton & F.Picard
Triainomyces  W. Rossi & A.Weir
Triceromyces  T.Majewski
Trochoideomyces  Thaxt.
Troglomyces  S.Colla
Zeugandromyces Thaxt.
Zodiomyces  Thaxt.

References

Laboulbeniaceae, List of
Laboulbeniaceae